KEPT-LP is a low power radio station broadcasting from Hayward, California. It is owned by Calvary Chapel of Hayward, Inc.

History
KEPT-LP began broadcasting on February 14, 2015.

References

External links
 

Organizations based in Hayward, California
2015 establishments in California
EPT-LP
Radio stations established in 2015
EPT-LP